Aldama Municipality is one of the 122 municipalities of Chiapas, in southern Mexico. The municipal seat is Aldama, Chiapas.

Demographics
As of 2010, the municipality had a total population of 5,072, up from 3,635 as of 2005.

As of 2010, the town of Aldama had a population of 1,273.

Localities
Other than the town of Aldama, the municipality had 20 localities, none of which had a population over 1,000.

References

Municipalities of Chiapas